Jiandemen Station is a subway station on Line 10 of the Beijing Subway.

Station layout 
The station has an underground island platform.

Exits 
There are 3 exits, lettered A, C, and D. Exits A and D are accessible.

Gallery

Around the station
 Madian Mosque

References

External links

Beijing Subway stations in Haidian District
Beijing Subway stations in Chaoyang District